E@I ("Education@Internet") is an international youth non-profit organization that hosts educational projects and meetings to support intercultural learning and the usage of languages and internet technologies.

E@I started as an informal international work group in 1999, before it was officially registered in Slovakia in 2005. E@I's activities include the development of educational websites (lernu! and Slovake.eu, among others); publishing, such as books and DVDs; and organizing conferences and seminars, including the biennial KAEST and the Esperanto Wikimania in 2011. A specialist group within the organization is dedicated to Wikipedia.

E@I is a member organization of the Council of Europe's European Youth Foundation and one of the 29 organizations represented in the European Commission's Civil Society Platform for Multlingualism. Projects run by the organization have been subsidized by the Esperantic Studies Foundation and the European Commission's Youth in Action programme and Lifelong Learning Programme (through EACEA). The coordinator of E@I's activities is Peter Baláž, who was elected Esperantist of the Year 2012 in a poll held by the magazine La Ondo de Esperanto.

History 

The Idea of E@I began in November 1999. A conference of the same name was soon held in April 2000 in Tollare, Sweden. As a result of this meeting, an international group with the same name was started. During the 56th IJK (International Youth Congress of Esperanto) in Hong Kong, Henning von Rosen and Hokan Lundberg presented the ideas and goals of E@I. In 2001, E@I registered their website, ikso.net. At the same time, the charitable foundation "E@I" was created in the cadre of UEA/TEJO. The second Esperanto@Interreto conference took place in October 2001 in Uppsala. The third conference followed in 2002. This conference was a collaboration with non-Esperantists, and was bilingual Esperanto/English. In between 2002 and 2004, many of E@I's projects were in development, especially lernu!, Lingva Prismo and Interkulturo. The first board of directors was also created, consisting of 5 members.

On 14 November 2005, E@I was registered as a civil association in the Ministry of Internal Affairs in Slovakia. E@I decided to officially register itself as "E@I" instead of the expanded "Esperanto@Interreto". On 1 August 2007, a new board of directors was inaugurated with the head position held by Peter Baláž. In 2007, E@I was accepted as a member of the EYF (European Youth Foundation).

E@I continues to work on its various internet projects and conferences today. The most recently completed project being, Slovake.eu, the first website dedicated to learning the Slovak language for which E@I has received a subsidy of 256,000 euros from the European Commission's EACEA. E@I has also started allowing university students to do internships through the Erasmus Programme.

In February 2012, Peter Baláž, Indre Pileckytė, Jevgenij Gaus and Neringa Gaus toured China as a result of the increasing number of Chinese lernu! users, and to possibly start a conference similar to SES in China.

Internal structure 

E@I is regulated by a statute under which a 3 to 9 member board of directors runs the organization. The other sections of E@I are its elected commission, its financial commission, and its members.

Members 

Members of E@I are those who have agreed to the terms of the statute of E@I and have sent the necessary information to E@I. Those in between the ages of 15 and 35 are considered regular members. Some people are considered special members without having voting rights. E@I membership is free of charge. According to the E@I website, there are now around 20 thousand members.

Board of directors 

The board of directors inaugurated on August 1, 2007 includes:

 Peter Baláž – Coordinating and project planning
 Marek Blahuš – General secretary
 Jevgenij Gaus – Administration of web projects
 Yves Nevelsteen – treasurer

The original board of directors was elected in April 2003, and consisted of Chuck Smith, Hokan Lundberg, Nastja Koĵevnikova, Ralf Frölich and Sonja Petrović.

Employees and interns 

Starting 2010, E@I accepted university students as interns who usually work for a few months on various E@I projects.

Office 

On the 1 June 2011, the town of Partizánske and its major, Jozef Božik, decided to give E@I its own office in downtown Partizánske, for the symbolic cost of 1 euro per year.

Activity

Seminars 

In the first few years of its existence, training on education and the internet were a regular part of the development of E@I, aiding it in finding many new members. For its first few years, E@I was a scholarly branch of TEJO. As a result, E@I's first few seminars were a collaboration with TEJO.

 E@I-2000 – Esperanto@Interreto – Stockholm (Sweden) – April 16 to 22, 2000
 E@I-2001 – Rete Kunlabori – Uppsala (Sweden) – October 27 to November 4, 2001
 E@I-2002 – Rete Lingvumi – Čačak (Yugoslavia) – April 28 to May 5, 2002
 E@I-4 – Rete Informadi – Lesjöfors (Sweden) – October 26 to November 3, 2002
 E@I-5 – Rete Lerni – Boston (United States) – April 19 to 26, 2003 (Massachusetts Institute of Technology)
 E@I-6 – Rete Interkulturumi - Sarajevo (Bosnia and Herzegovina) – March 21 to 27, 2004
 E@I-7 – Ni sciigu aliajn pri ni – Partizánske (Slovakia) - June 4 to 11, 2005
 E@I-8 – Lingvoj en interreto – Brno (Czech Republic) – November 4 to 12, 2006

SES 

Starting in 2007, E@I has arranged a conference every summer entitled SES. In 2007, the title was "Slava Esperanto-Studado" (Slavic Esperanto-Study), but since then the conference has been renamed to "Somera Esperanto-Studado".

KAEST 

KAEST stands for "Konferenco pri Aplikoj de Esperanto en Scienco kaj Tekniko" (Conference on the Application of Esperanto in Science and Technology) and is a biannual conference held by E@I. The event has a history going back to Czechoslovakia of 1978, and the first KAEST held by E@I took place in November 2010 in Modra. The conference is organized by E@I with financial support from organizations such as International Esperanto Institute and Esperantic Studies Foundation.

Projects 
E@I has created several websites and publications related to education on the internet that are related to learning languages.

lernu! 

lernu! is a multilingual course for students of Esperanto. In addition to courses at different levels, the site contains additional learning tools such as dictionaries, a grammatical overview, spoken stories with pictures, an instant messenger and more.

Slovake.eu 

Slovake.eu is a multilingual website to teach the Slovak language to foreigners. The project is supported by the European Commission's agency EACEA within its Lifelong learning programme and was launched in March 2011. The website was being constructed on the basis of experience gained in lernu.net and other internet projects. Six partners from five countries participated in the project.

Komputeko 

Komputeko is a portal of computer related terms in as many languages as possible, created in order to promote correct language usage and face the use of (often crippled forms of) US English terms.

Polish DVD 
On 10 September 2008, a DVD titled Esperanto produced by E@I was included as a free attachment to the leading Polish newspaper Gazeta Wyborcza, commissioned by the city of Białystok as part of the official campaign preceding the 150th birth anniversary of L. L. Zamenhof, the creator of Esperanto born in 1859 in Białystok, and promoting the 94th World Congress of Esperanto which was to be held in Białystok from 25 July to 1 August 2009. The DVD was issued in 364,000 copies.

Reta PIV 

An internet version of the Plena Ilustrita Vortaro, the largest monolingual dictionary of Esperanto. This project has been realized with the cooperation of SAT, the publisher of PIV and holder of its author rights, and with the help of donations crowdsourced from Esperanto associations, Esperanto clubs and individual Esperantists.

Deutsch.info 

Deutsch.info is a multilingual website for teaching German to non-German speakers. Similarly to Slovake.eu, the project is supported by European Commission's agency EACEA within its Lifelong learning programme, and was launched in 2013. The website was created based on the experience with lernu!, Slovake.eu and other internet projects. There are 8 partners from 6 countries participating in the project, and is available in 9 languages.

References

External links 

 Website

Non-profit technology
Youth organisations based in Slovakia
Educational technology companies
Language education organizations
Esperanto organizations
Esperanto in Slovakia